Chang'anying is a rural town in Chengbu Miao Autonomous County, Hunan, China. It is surrounded by Zhaishi Miao Ethnic and Dong Ethnic Township on the north, Wanfoshan Town on the west, Dankou Town on the east, Wutuan Town on the southeast, and Pingdeng Town on the southwest. It lies at the border of three provinces of Hunan, Guizhou and Guangxi, which made it even a place of strategic importance in ancient China.

Name
The town was named after Chang'anying, a military camp established in 1741 during the Qianlong period (1736–1795) of the Qing dynasty (1644–1911). "Military camp" is called "Ying" in Chinese. The name of the town means the long period of stability of the town.

History
In the early Han dynasty (206 BC–220 AD), the Miao people settled in the region and became an aboriginal people.

In 1436, in the 1st year of Zhengtong period (1436–1449) of the Ming dynasty (1368–1644), Mengneng, a tribal chief of Dong people, united with the Dong and Miao people in Longsheng Various Nationalities Autonomous County to start an uprising. In 1460, they won a military victory.

In 1740, in the region of Qianlong Emperor (1736–1795) of the Qing dynasty (1644–1911), the Qing government put down the rebellion which was led by Miao chiefs Yang Qingbao and Su Xianyu. In 1741, the Chang'anying, a military organization was set up here. Two years later, the Chang'anying city was built with government funding.

In the early Republic of China (1912–1949), in the midst of the warlord's melee, Zhou Baochen was a local despot and reigned here. In 1918, he led 500 people to burn the city after robbing it.

On December 31, 2015, the former Nanshan Town was demerged, some areas were merged into Wutuan Town, and the other areas were merged into Chang'anying Township to form a town.

Administrative division
As of 2015, the town is divided into 15 villages: Yanzhai, Dazhai, Changping, Hengpo, Shangpai, Xiapai, Liujia, Liuma, Desheng, Bashu, Changxing, Huangyang, Shuangtang, Chang'anying, Juezhiping, and 3 communities: Daping, Jianjiaping, Jizhuaping.

Geography
The town is located in the southwest of Chengbu Miao Autonomous County.

The Pingdeng River flows through the town north to south.

Demographics
On December 31, 2015, the National Bureau of Statistics of the People's Republic of China estimates the town's population was 8,013. Miao people is the dominant ethnic group in the town, accounting for 57% of the total population. There are also 12 ethnic groups, such as Dong, Yao, Hui, Zhuang, Tujia and Manchu.

Botany
The town has a 1,600-year-old fir tree.

Tourist spots
The Drum-tower of Dong people is a famous tourist attraction.

The Wenchang Pavilion is a historic building in the town.

A Red Army Monument is located in the village of Changping.

References

Chengbu Miao Autonomous County